Nils Kihlberg (4 June 1915 – 2 April 1965) was a Swedish actor, singer and director known for En trallande jänta (1942), Bröderna Östermans huskors (1945) and Det är min musik (1942). He died on April 2, 1965 in Stockholm. Nils appeared in approximately 40 films and He was married to actress Mimi Nelson.

Selected filmography
 Circus (1939)
 Beredskapspojkar (1940)
 It Is My Music (1942)
 Snapphanar (1941)
 En trallande jänta (1942)
 Det är min musik (1942)
 Life and Death (1943)
 Men of the Navy (1943)
 Motherhood (1945)
 The Österman Brothers' Virago (1945)
 While the Door Was Locked (1946)
 Teacher's First Born (1950)
 Mord, lilla vän (1955)
 When the Mills are Running (1956)
 Laughing in the Sunshine (1956)
 Änglar, finns dom? (1961)

External links

1915 births
1965 deaths
Swedish male film actors
20th-century Swedish male actors